Francisco Páez is a Guatemalan singer and songwriter. He is the vocalist for the rock/pop Latino band Malacates Trébol Shop.

Páez began playing the guitar as a youth. He attended college and eventually became an architect. Páez currently lives in Guatemala City, where he continues his musical career.

References 

Year of birth missing (living people)
Living people
Guatemalan male singer-songwriters
Place of birth missing (living people)
Guatemalan architects
People from Guatemala City